Fresh Air is the 13th studio album by Faust, released on May 5, 2017. It is a combination of live and studio recordings captured during a 28-day tour of the US in March and April 2016.

Track listing

Personnel
Adapted from AllMusic.

Faust
Werner "Zappi" Diermaier
Jean-Hervé Péron
Maxime Manac'h

Guest musicians
Beata Budkiewicz
Michael Day
Braden Diotte
Jürgen Engler
Ulrich Krieger
Barbara Manning
Robert Pepper
Ysanne Spevack
Ulrike Stöve

Production
Dirk Dresselhaus – Editing, Mixing
Jeanne-Marie Varain – Artwork
Tom Meyer – Mastering

References

2017 albums
Krautrock albums
Faust (band) albums